Graziella de Cássia Schmitt Silva, commonly known as Graziella Schmitt (born May 26, 1981), is a Brazilian actress. She played the lead role in the telenovela Amor e Revolução and as of 2013 plays the lead role in Belmonte.

Career 
Born in Porto Alegre, Rio Grande do Sul state, after working as a paquita (dancer) in Xuxa Park from 1995 to 2000, and in 2002 playing Laila in Sandy & Junior and presenting TV Globinho, she was cast as Vivi in Malhação in 2004. The character she played was the stereotypical popular girl in school. After guest starring in other programs such as Pé na Jaca in 2007 as Renatinha, Por Toda Minha Vida in 2008 and Mina, she played Tina Tinia in 2008 Rede Globo's telenovela A Favorita. Graziella Schmitt returned to Malhação in 2009, playing a different character, this time she played biology teacher Letícia. She plays the lead role in SBT's telenovela Amor e Revolução. The telenovela debuted on April 5, 2011, and she played Maria Paixão, who is the daughter of a communist journalist, and fights against the military dictatorship in Brazil. Her character falls in love to José Guerra, played by Cláudio Lins, who is the son of one of the soldiers involved in the 1964 coup d'état. Grazilella Schmitt stars as Paula in the 2013 Portuguese telenovela Belmonte.

Filmography

Television

Cinema

Theater

Footnotes

References

External links 
 

1981 births
Living people
People from Porto Alegre
Brazilian film actresses
Brazilian telenovela actresses
Brazilian people of German descent
Brazilian stage actresses